Javarus Dudley (born December 18, 1981) is  former American football wide receiver who played in the Arena Football League (AFL) for the Orlando Predators, New Orleans VooDoo and Tampa Bay Storm. He attended Fordham University.

External links
AFL stats

1981 births
Living people
American football wide receivers
Sportspeople from Hollywood, Florida
Players of American football from Florida
Fordham Rams football players
Orlando Predators players
New Orleans VooDoo players
Tampa Bay Storm players